Gambler is the name of three supervillains appearing in American comic books published by DC Comics.

Steven Sharpe's version of Gambler was played by Eric Goins in the television series Stargirl in the first and third seasons for DC Universe and The CW network.

Publication history
The Steven Sharpe III version of Gambler first appeared in 1944 in Green Lantern #12 in a story titled "The Gambler" by writer Henry Kuttner and artist Martin Nodell, as a foe of the original Green Lantern. In October 1947, the Gambler was one of the six original members of the Injustice Society, who began battling the Justice Society of America in All Star Comics #37 (Oct. 1947).

The Steven Sharpe V version of Gambler first appeared in New Titans #68 and was created by Karl Kesel, Barbara Kesel and Steve Erwin.

Fictional character biographies

Steven Sharpe III

Steven Sharpe III came from a long line of compulsive gamblers. When he proposed to his girlfriend Helen the day after his high school graduation, she refused unless he could prove he was not a compulsive gambler like his grandfather. She then ran off with a "Pool Hall" Charlie, another gambler, who had just won a fortune on the lottery. Sharpe vowed to become a new person after this day. As luck would have it, an armored truck crashed a few feet away from him. Seeing this as a sign, Sharpe helped himself to all of the money he could get and vowed to take whatever he could from life from that day on. He adopted the name the Gambler in remembrance of his grandfather. For the next few years, the Gambler joined a traveling carnival, where he gained his skills with disguises, pistols, and throwing knives.

Sharpe was immediately successful as a criminal. He started off robbing trains and small town banks. Growing bored, he moved East to the big cities. He was spotted in Gotham City by Green Lantern while standing next to his own wanted poster. The Gambler eluded Green Lantern twice using his special Derringer pistol, which could fire ammonia or blackout gas in addition to real bullets. When he emerged again, he had adopted a new identity after his riverboat gambling grandfather: the Gambler. As the Gambler, he earned early fame by pulling off a small town bank robbery against heavy odds. At some point, Sharpe spent time with a carnival, learning a variety of knife throws and make-up techniques to complete his disguises. So effective were his disguises that Sharpe himself claims to have forgotten his original appearance and his age to this day remains unknown. Initially, Sharpe remained in the Mississippi Delta, robbing trains, small town banks and the like. One of the first true costumed criminals, he rapidly became one of the most successful criminals and developed a cult of personality reminiscent of the gangsters of the previous decade.

By 1944, the Gambler's ego was not satisfied with his Midwestern successes and took his operations to the larger cities of the East. He took the brazen tack of hanging out in post offices next to his own "Wanted" poster to provoke passers-by, two of which were Alan Scott and Doiby Dickles. Realizing that the famous criminal was in Gotham City, Scott assumed his identity as Green Lantern and pursued the criminal. He caught up with the Gambler twice, only to be thwarted by the special Derringer pistol that the Gambler kept hidden in his sleeve, one which fired ammonia or blackout gas. Finally, at a horse race, the Gambler decided to shift the odds in his favor by provoking the horses to stampede into the crowds to cover his escape. Green Lantern rounded up the beasts, however, and after the capture of his henchmen, the Gambler himself was apprehended and sent to Gotham State Penitentiary as #131313 (Green Lantern #12).

Gambler, like most criminals in comics, was extremely adept at escaping from prison. In 1946, he wrote a note to Green Lantern telling the hero that he would escape prison and then daring the hero to stop him. When the hero arrived to search the prison, he was surprised to see his friend Doiby Dickles in a cell. The Gambler had used his mastery of disguise to confuse Green Lantern. In the confusion, Gambler managed to escape with Green Lantern's help, as well as to free all of the inmates of the prison. He used the real Dickles as a hostage to escape Green Lantern. In another escape, Gambler bribed the executioner at his own electrocution to rig the floor to be electrified instead of the chair. This incapacitated the crowd, which included Green Lantern, and allowed him to escape.

Gambler clashed with Green Lantern many more times over the years. At one time, he won a gambling vessel and armed it to the teeth. Another time he helped an art collector commit insurance fraud, coming into conflict with Starman and the Sandman.

Gambler was one of the original members of the Injustice Society, which planned to kill the Justice Society and control the United States using an army of escaped convicts. The Gambler was able to capture the Atom, and all the other members save Green Lantern were imprisoned. This group failed miserably due to Green Lantern impersonating the Thinker after faking his death, and Gambler returned to prison. He escaped from prison again and came into conflict with the Flash and Green Lantern. He even teamed up with the Icicle and the Fiddler in an attempt to kill Starman.

At one point, Gambler married and had a son. He also had two grandchildren, to whom he imparted much of his criminal knowledge. The last time that Sharpe was paroled, he traveled to Las Vegas. He fell in love with the gambling in the Taj Mahal Casino. What the Gambler did not know was that the games in this casino were rigged and he soon lost every penny. This final defeat, coupled with all of the defeats he had suffered at the hands of costumed heroes, was too much for Sharpe. Using his famous Derringer pistol, he shot himself in the head.

His suicide was later avenged by his granddaughter Rebecca who became the villain known as Hazard. His grandson Steven V became the second Gambler.

Due to the irregularities of comic book time and the difficulty of merging Earth-2 (which was a "real" time comic book timeline) into a new Post-Crisis Earth, the year of the Gambler's suicide was either 1) a historical 1985 or 1986, or 2) a movable "one year before the debut of Injustice Unlimited" according to Hazard's background tale told in Infinity Inc. #35 (1987).

As part of the Blackest Night event, Steven III's corpse is reanimated by a black power ring and recruited to the Black Lantern Corps.

In the DC Universe following the end of the DC Rebirth brand, Gambler was seen as a member of the Injustice Society when Hawkman and Hawkgirl recount their time in the 1940s when the Justice Society fought the Injustice Society. Sandman was the one who faced off against Gambler and defeated him.

Steven Sharpe V
After the death of Steven III, Steven Sharpe V took over his grandfather's mantle as the Gambler. While keeping his identity as the Gambler hidden and masquerading as the Joker, he reorganized and reoutfitted the Royal Flush Gang. Under his leadership, the Gang battled the New Titans, but were defeated.

The Gambler teamed up with Amos Fortune, the Wizard (William Zard), and the second Sportsmaster, and created a super-powered "fight club" using members of the Justice Society as combatants. The fight club was broken up by Stargirl, Gypsy, and Vixen.

Third Gambler
In DC Rebirth, an unnamed Gambler was seen trying to rob a bank, only to be thwarted by Simon Baz and Jessica Cruz.

Powers and abilities
Gambler is an expert gambler, strategist, and master of disguise. Despite lacking any real superpowers, his cunning nature and talent for spotting opportunities makes him extremely unpredictable and dangerous.

Equipment
Gambler is highly skilled with his signature weapon, a derringer pistol he keeps concealed on his person and has been modified to shoot different kinds of gases depending on the situation. He also is highly trained in the use of throwing knives.

In other media
 The Gambler appears in the live-action television series Stargirl, portrayed by Eric Goins. This version is a member of the Injustice Society, is an expert computer hacker, wields a derringer, and was the nemesis of Doctor Mid-Nite rather than the Green Lantern. First appearing in the pilot episode, Steven Sharpe accompanies the Injustice Society in their attack on the Justice Society of America, during which he fought the JSA's leader Starman. In his civilian identity, Sharpe is the egocentric and cut-off CFO of The American Dream, a private firm that works to economically revitalize Blue Valley. In the episode "S.T.R.I.P.E.", Sharpe meets with his leader, Icicle, to discuss whether Starman's successor, Stargirl, is a potential threat to their plans. After assisting Icicle in making preparations, Sharpe helps the ISA enact Project: New America in the two-part episode, "Stars and S.T.R.I.P.E." However, after Stargirl's JSA foil their plans, he wipes the ISA's servers and escapes while his teammates are either killed or captured. In the season three episode "Frenemies – Chapter One: The Murder", Sharpe returns to Blue Valley to make amends, but is rebuffed by Pat Dugan and Shade. While working on a letter to his estranged daughter Rebecca, he finds that someone is filming certain locations in Blue Valley. While investigating a camera outside of his trailer, Sharpe is killed by an unknown assailant.
 The Steven Sharpe III incarnation of Gambler appears in All-New Batman: The Brave and the Bold #7.

References

External links
 Rapsheet
 Golden Age Villain Checklist
 Writeups.org

Characters created by Karl Kesel
Comics characters introduced in 1944
DC Comics male supervillains
DC Comics supervillains
Earth-Two
Fictional blade and dart throwers
Fictional characters from parallel universes
Fictional gamblers
Golden Age supervillains